The Prempeh Jubilee Museum is a museum located in Kumasi, Ghana. It was established in 1954.

References

See also 
 List of museums in Ghana

Museums in Ghana
Buildings and structures in Kumasi
Museums established in 1954
1954 establishments in Gold Coast (British colony)